The Gen. Martin Kellogg House, now more commonly known as the Kellog-Eddy House, is a historic house museum at 679 Willard Avenue in Newington, Connecticut.  Built about 1808, it is a well-preserved example of Federal period residential architecture, and it was home to two of Newington's leading citizens.  The house was listed on the National Register of Historic Places on October 1, 1987.

Description and history
The Kellogg-Eddy House stands west of Newington center, on the west side of Willard Avenue (Connecticut Route 173), north of its junction with Cedar Street.  It is a -story wood-frame structure, five bays wide, with a center entrance and two interior chimneys.  Its front entry has a fanlight above and is sheltered by an original portico supported by turned columns.  There are two two-story wings extending to the side and rear, which were added in 1927–28.

The main house was built c. 1808 by William Kellogg, the fourth of that name, who was a leading citizen of Newington, for his son Martin.  Primarily a farmer, he received his military title for service in the state militia.  Kellogg was instrumental in establishing a local academy for higher education in 1829.  The house and farm were purchased in 1913 by Elford Welles Eddy, who was a distant cousin to the Kelloggs.  Eddy kept a dairy herd on the farm, and served on the local library and water district boards.  He also served one term in the state legislature.  The town acquired the house from his widow in 1975. It is now operated by the local historical society and operated as a museum.

See also
National Register of Historic Places listings in Hartford County, Connecticut

References

External links
 Newington Historical Society: Museums

Houses on the National Register of Historic Places in Connecticut
Georgian architecture in Connecticut
Federal architecture in Connecticut
Houses completed in 1808
Newington, Connecticut
Houses in Hartford County, Connecticut
Museums in Hartford County, Connecticut
Historic house museums in Connecticut
National Register of Historic Places in Hartford County, Connecticut